Tropical Storm Fernand was a short-lived but deadly tropical cyclone that struck parts of Veracruz state, Mexico, causing flash flooding and landslides. The sixth tropical storm of the 2013 Atlantic hurricane season, Fernand developed from the merger of two tropical waves that had moved off the coast of Africa in the Bay of Campeche on August 25. Quickly organizing, the cyclone strengthened into a tropical storm and eventually made landfall on the coast of Mexico as a moderate to strong tropical storm. Fernand persisted for another day inland before dissipating over the mountainous terrain of the country. During its relatively short lifespan, Fernand caused numerous flash floods in its wake which resulted in the deaths of 14 people in and around the areas of Veracruz.

Meteorological history 

The origins of Fernand were a bit complex, having resulted as the development from a disturbance that had formed from the interaction of two tropical waves in the eastern Atlantic. The first one moved off the coast of Africa on August 10 and progressed westwards across the Atlantic. The second tropical wave, which spawned Tropical Storm Erin, moved off on August 13. As the wave tracked westwards, they became increasingly harder to track due to the associated moisture, but by August 20 a new tropical wave had developed east of the Lesser Antilles. Little change in organization occurred while it tracked westward across the Caribbean Sea, and was only first spotted by the National Hurricane Center (NHC) on August 23 as it neared the Yucatán Peninsula. Despite moving over land, the circulation of the disturbance became better defined as it crossed the Yucatán Peninsula. By early on August 25, the disturbance exited into the Bay of Campeche, at which time the odds of development had been increased to 60%. Shortly afterwards, an Air Force reconnaissance aircraft found surface winds of up to tropical storm-force, and the depression was upgraded to Tropical Storm Fernand at 18:00 UTC, operationally it was not upgraded until about three hours later.

Rapid weakening occurred as it tracked over the mountainous terrain of Mexico, and Fernand weakened to a tropical depression at 12:00 UTC that day, degenerating into a remnant low hours later. The center later dissipated at 00:00 UTC on August 27.

Preparations and impact
On August 25, a tropical storm warning was posted for the Gulf Coast of Mexico from the Veracruz city northward to Tampico. Warnings were canceled north of Barra de Nautla, Veracruz state early on August 26, and discontinued entirely after Fernand weakened to a tropical depression. The Mexican Navy helped people in Veracruz evacuate their homes efficiently. Classes at all levels of education in the state were closed during the storm's passage. Impact from the storm in Mexico was most severe in Veracruz, where 13 people were killed by landslides: nine in Yecuatla, three in Tuxpan, and one in Atzalán. In the city of Veracruz, heavy rainfall flooded roads, while downed trees caused power outages. In Boca del Río, flooding stranded people at a shopping plaza. Damage was reported in 19 municipalities, mostly in northern and central Veracruz. The storm damaged 457 homes and caused four rivers to overflow. In Oaxaca, a man died after being swept away by a swollen river. After the storm, Veracruz governor Javier Duarte declared a state of emergency for 92 municipalities, which allowed farmers who sustained damage to receive aid. In all, the storm caused "millions" of dollars in damages.

See also
Tropical Storm Jose (2005) – similar storm which rapidly strengthened to near hurricane-strength in nearly the same location
Tropical Storm Marco (2008) – smallest tropical cyclone on record which achieved a similar intensity in the Bay of Campeche
Tropical Storm Danielle (2016) – earliest fourth-named storm on record which struck similar areas

References 

2013 Atlantic hurricane season
2013 in Mexico
Atlantic tropical storms
Atlantic hurricanes in Mexico
Fernand